Angus George Dalgleish (born May 1950) FRCP FRCPath FMedSci is a professor of oncology at St George's, University of London, best known for his contributions to HIV/AIDS research. Dalgleish stood in 2015 for Parliament as a UKIP candidate.

Education
Angus George Dalgleish was born in May 1950 in Harrow, London. Initially educated at the Harrow County School for Boys, Dalgleish received a Bachelor of Medicine, Bachelor of Surgery degree from University College London with an intercalated bachelor's degree in Anatomy.

Career as medical researcher
After various positions in the United Kingdom, Dalgleish joined the Royal Flying Doctor Service in Mount Isa, Queensland, then progressed through positions at various hospitals in Brisbane, Australia, before moving to the Ludwig Institute for Cancer Research in Sydney.

After completion of his training, Dalgleish returned to work in the UK in 1984 at the Institute of Cancer Research. He is a co-discoverer of the CD4 receptor as the major cellular receptor for HIV.
 In 1986, he was appointed to a consulting position at Northwick Park Hospital, in 1991 he was made Foundation Professor of Oncology at St George's, University of London, and in 1994 he was appointed Visiting Professor at the Institute of Cancer Research in London.

In 1997, he founded Onyvax Ltd., a privately-funded biotechnology company developing cancer vaccines, where he held the position as Research Director; it was dissolved in 2013. Dalgleish is a member of the medical board in Bionor Pharma.  Dalgleish is on the scientific advisory board of Immodulon, and has stock options in Immunor AS, a disclosure he made in order to have his research work published.

During the COVID-19 pandemic, Dalgleish was criticised for being a proponent of the lab leak theory.

2015 candidacy for Parliament
Dalgleish was a member of the UK Independence Party and stood as a candidate in Sutton & Cheam, during the 2015 United Kingdom general election finishing fourth with 10.7% of the vote. Dalgleish campaigned for Leave.EU and appeared on the BBC Radio 4 Today programme presenting the case for Brexit. He was an advocate of Leave Means Leave, a Eurosceptic group.

Awards and honours
Dalgleish was elected a Fellow of the Academy of Medical Sciences in 2001 and is also a Fellow of the Royal College of Physicians the Royal College of Pathologists and a Fellow of the Royal Australasian College of Physicians. His citation on election to FMedSci reads:

Bibliography

References

External links
 Explosive study claims to prove Chinese scientists created COVID

British oncologists
British pathologists
Vaccinologists
Cancer researchers
1950 births
Living people
Alumni of University College London
People from Harrow, London
People educated at Harrow High School
UK Independence Party parliamentary candidates
COVID-19 pandemic in the United Kingdom
English male non-fiction writers
21st-century English male writers
English non-fiction outdoors writers